Nicrophorus didymus is a burying beetle described by Gaspard Auguste Brullé in 1836.

References
 

Silphidae
Beetles of North America
Beetles described in 1836
Taxa named by Gaspard Auguste Brullé